This Is It is a Nigerian romantic drama television series that ran for two seasons from September 2016 until November 2017. The series began airing on the YouTube channel of its creator, LowlaDee, but was later acquired by television networks across Africa. The story revolves around a newly married couple and the challenges they face while coming to terms of their newly attained status.

Plot 
Tee, aged 27, is a Kenyan-Nigerian software developer, who recently marries Dede, aged 23. As an inexperienced couple, they face challenges in trying to conform with friends, families and themselves on the present realities of their status as a newly married couple. The final episode aired in November 2017, featuring marital experiences of young couples in the real world.

Cast 
 Bimbo Ademoye as Kerry
 Nick Mutuma as Tomide (Tee)
 Chy Nwakanma as Dede Mwenda
 Stan Nze as Sam
 Jemima Osunde
 Olumide Oworu

Release 
In April 2017, the series was reported to premiere in NTV Kenya.

Episode

Season One (2016)

Season Two (2017)

Reception

Critical reception 
Abigael Arunga for Daily Nation (Kenya) praised the story and performance of the cast members, but felt that the role of "Dede" (played by Chy Nwakanma) was overly dramatized in some instances. Ife Olujuyigbe for True Nollywood Stories gave it a 75% rating, but criticized the lack of talents in the child actors used in the series, and recommended proper auditioning to fix it. It also panned the performance of "Toby", an old friend of one of the main cast, describing him as a "terrible actor". The believability of the appearance of characters in flashbacks were also highlighted as not being properly done. The film was praised for his picture quality, sound and the chemistry between "Tomide" and "Dede", with the reviewer envisaging a possibility of a real-life relationship between them. It summarized its review by concluding that "This is It is a total package of fun, love and everything in between.".  It also received positive remarks from YNaija.

In November 2016, Pulse outlined romantic synergy among lead cast, artistry of its director, viewing statistics and the aura of its cast members as reasons why the series stands out and is worth a watch. In December 2017, it was ranked 5th in a top five list of best television series by Pulse Nigeria.

Accolades

References

External links

2016 Nigerian television series debuts
Africa Magic Viewers' Choice Awards winners
Kenyan drama television series
Nigerian drama television series
Nigerian television series